The Elandsputte cattle dip is a provincial heritage site in Lichtenburg in the North West province of South Africa.

In 1980 it was described in the Government Gazette as

References
 South African Heritage Resource Agency database

Buildings and structures in North West (South African province)
Historic sites in South Africa
Plunge dips